The Republic of China calendar, often shortened to the ROC calendar or the Minguo calendar, is a calendar used in Taiwan, Penghu, Kinmen, and Matsu. The calendar uses 1912, the year of the establishment of the Republic of China (ROC) in Nanjing, as the first year.

The ROC calendar follows the tradition of using the sovereign's era name and year of reign, as did previous Chinese dynasties. Months and days are numbered according to the Gregorian calendar. The ROC calendar has been in wide use in the ROC since 1912, including in early official documents.

The ROC calendar is the official calendar used in Taiwan and Penghu since 1945, and also adopted by Overseas Chinese and Taiwanese communities. Chorographies and historical research published in mainland China covering the period between 1912 and 1949 also use the ROC calendar.

Calendar details
The Gregorian calendar was adopted by the nascent Republic of China effective 1 January 1912 for official business, but the general populace continued to use the traditional lunisolar Chinese calendar.  The status of the Gregorian calendar was unclear between 1916 and 1921 while China was controlled by several competing warlords each supported by foreign colonial powers. From about 1921 until 1928 warlords continued to fight over northern China, but the Kuomintang-led Nationalist government controlled southern China and used the Gregorian calendar. After the Kuomintang reconstituted the Republic of China on 10 October 1928, the Gregorian calendar was officially adopted, effective 1 January 1929. The People's Republic of China has continued to use the Gregorian calendar since 1949.

Despite the adoption of the Gregorian calendar, the numbering of the years was still an issue. The Chinese monarchical tradition was to use the monarch's era name and year of reign. One alternative to this approach was to use the reign of the semi-legendary Yellow Emperor in the third millennium BC to number the years. In the early 20th century, some Chinese republicans began to advocate such a system of continuously numbered years, so that year markings would be independent of the monarch's era name. (This was part of their attempt to de-legitimize the Qing dynasty.)

When Sun Yat-sen became the provisional president of the Republic of China, he sent telegrams to leaders of all provinces and announced the 13th day of 11th month of the 4609th year of the Yellow Emperor's reign (corresponding to 1 January 1912) to be the first year of the Republic of China. The original intention of the Minguo calendar was to follow the monarchical practice of naming the years according to the number of years the monarch had reigned, which was a universally recognizable event in China. Following the establishment of the Republic, hence the lack of a monarch, it was then decided to use the year of the establishment of the current regime. This reduced the issue of frequent change in the calendar, as no Chinese emperor ruled more than 61 years in Chinese history – the longest being the Kangxi Emperor, who ruled from 1662 to 1722 (Kangxi 61). (Qianlong Emperor abdicated in 1795, i.e. Qianlong 60, but the reign name of Qianlong is still used unofficially until his death in 1799 i.e. Qianlong 64.)

Based on National Standards of the Republic of China CNS 7648: Data Elements and Interchange Formats—Information Interchange—Representation of Dates and Times (similar to ISO 8601), year numbering may use the Gregorian system as well as the ROC era. For example,    may be written -- or ROC --.

The ROC era numbering happens to be the same as the numbering used by the Juche calendar of North Korea, because its founder, Kim Il-sung, was born in 1912. The years in Japan's Taishō era (30 July 1912 to 25 December 1926) also coincide with those of the ROC era.

In addition to the ROC's Minguo calendar, Taiwanese continue to use the lunar Chinese calendar for certain functions such as the dates of many holidays, the calculation of people's ages, and religious functions.

Arguments for and against

The use of the ROC era system extends beyond official documents. Misinterpretation is more likely in the cases when the prefix (ROC or ) is omitted.

There have been legislative proposals by political parties of the Pan-Green Coalition that support Taiwanese independence, such as the Democratic Progressive Party, to formally abolish the ROC calendar in favor of the Gregorian calendar.

Relation to the Gregorian calendar
To convert any Gregorian calendar year (1912 and after) to ROC calendar, subtract 1911.

See also
 Chinese era name
 East Asian age reckoning
 Public holidays in Taiwan
 Juche calendar

References 

1912 establishments in China
1912 introductions
Chinese calendars
Calendar
Modified Gregorian calendars
Taiwan under Republic of China rule
Society of Taiwan
Taiwanese culture
Time in Taiwan